Pakucaris is an extinct genus of bivalved arthropod known from a single species, Pakucaris apatis, found in the Marble Canyon locality of the Burgess Shale in British Columbia, Canada. It is thought to be a member of Hymenocarina. Unlike other members of that group, the posterior segments are covered with a separate pygidium shield, covergent on other arthropods like artiopods. The main bivalved carapace covers around 80% of the body, with the pygidium covering the remaining 20%. The head has a forward and downward facing pair of moderately sized eyes on short stalks, along with three pairs of cephalic appendages. The thorax has either 30-35 or 70-80 segments, depending on the specimen, while the pygidium has either 11-13 or 20 segments. The segments of the thorax and pygidium have pairs of thin filamentous limbs divided into 20/21 podomeres, with paddle-like exopods. It was probably nektobenthic (actively swimming close to the seafloor), and its ecology was likely that of a selective suspension feeder, using its limbs to scrape and/or suspend food particles from the sea floor, before using its limbs to capture and transfer them to the mouth.

References 

Prehistoric arthropod genera
Cambrian arthropods
Cambrian arthropods of North America
Cambrian Canada
Fossils of Canada
Burgess Shale fossils
Hymenocarina
Fossil taxa described in 2021